The Rokeby Baronetcy, of Skiers in the County of York, was a title in the Baronetage of England.  It was created on 29 January 1661 for William Rokeby.  The title became extinct on the death of the third Baronet in 1678.

Rokeby baronets, of Skiers (1661)
Sir William Rokeby, 1st Baronet ( – )
Sir William Rokeby, 2nd Baronet (c. 1656 – 1678)
Sir Willoughby Rokeby, 3rd Baronet (c. 1632 – 1678)

References

Extinct baronetcies in the Baronetage of England
1661 establishments in England